Still Serious is the second solo studio album by American rapper Big Mike. It was released on April 8, 1997, via Rap-A-Lot Records. Production of the album was handled by Mike Dean, Mike B., Loranzo Samuels, Anthony Dent and N.O. Joe. This album proved to be the most successful of Big Mike's solo releases, peaking at #16 on the Billboard 200 and #3 on the Top R&B/Hip-Hop Albums.

Track listing

Charts

Weekly charts

Year-end charts

References

External links

1997 albums
Big Mike albums
Rap-A-Lot Records albums
Albums produced by N.O. Joe
Albums produced by Mike Dean (record producer)